Chamaecrista bucherae is a species of legume in the plant family Fabaceae. This shrub rarely attains the size of a small tree. It is confined to coastal lowland. It is in danger of extinction because of degrading land. It is found only in Cuba.

References

bucherae
Flora of Cuba
Vulnerable plants
Taxonomy articles created by Polbot